The Pointe de Corsen is the westernmost point of continental France, located west of Brest in the Plouarzel Commune, Finistère, Brittany. The nearest village is Ruscumunoc.

A CROSS sea monitoring site is located at the point.

Pointe de Corsen is located at

See also 

 Pointe du Raz

Headlands of Brittany
Landforms of Finistère
Extreme points of France